The Ethiopian National Theatre is a national theatre in central Addis Ababa, Ethiopia.

Overview 
Formerly known as the Haile Selassie I Theater, the hall had begun to be built during the Italian occupation as the Cinema Marconi with some 350 seats. The building was later completed in 1955 for the celebrations of the Silver Jubilee, and expanded to seat 1260 people. The theatre group was founded by the government in the late 1940s, with the main objective of playing Ethiopian songs by soloists accompanied by a modern orchestra.

The Austrian composer Franz Zelwecker became the first director of the National Theater.

The theater is divided into two directorates, one for theater and the other for music. The music directorate includes the Izra Folk Music and Dance Group, Yared Modern Orchestra, Dawit POP Orchestra and String Orchestra.

See also
National Theater of Somalia

References
Ethiopian Ministry of Youth Sports and Culture

Theatres completed in 1955
Theatres in Ethiopia
Buildings and structures in Addis Ababa
Culture in Addis Ababa
1955 establishments in Ethiopia
20th-century architecture in Ethiopia